Leniea is a genus of Antarctic marine red alga.

The genus name of Leniea is in honour of Pieter J. Lenie (1923-2015) (Belgian-) American (captain of the American Antarctic research ship RV Hero).

The genus was circumscribed by Richard Lee Moe in Bot. Mar. vol.52 on page 523 in 2009.

References

Kallymeniaceae
Plants described in 2009